Damien Boisseau is a French actor who specializes in dubbing. He is the official voice-over artist of Matt Damon, Edward Norton, James Marsden, Casper Van Dien and Patrick Dempsey, and also a recurring voice of Josh Hartnett or Jared Padalecki.

Roles

Live action
 The Butterfly Effect (Evan Trehorn (Ashton Kutcher))
 Charlie and the Chocolate Factory (Willy Wonka (Johnny Depp))
 Enchanted (Robert (Patrick Dempsey))
 The Hitcher (Jim Halsey (Zachary Knighton))
 Ocean's Eleven (Linus Caldwell (Matt Damon))
 The Texas Chainsaw Massacre (Kemper (Eric Balfour))
 X-Men film series (Cyclops (James Marsden))
 Miracle at Midnight (Henrik Koster (Justin Whalin))
 Cinderella (Prince Christopher (Paolo Montalbán))
 Radio Days (Joe (Seth Green))

DTV
 Cinderella III: A Twist in Time (Prince Charming (Christopher Daniel Barnes))
 Mune: Guardian of the Moon (2014)

Animated
 Samurai Jack (Jack Phil LaMarr)

Video games
 Jak and Daxter (Jak (Mike Erwin))
 Red Faction (Parker (Dale Inghram))
 The Legend of Spyro: A New Beginning (Kane (Phil LaMarr))

References

External links
 
 
  Damien Boisseau at Agents Artistes
  Damien Boisseau at RS Doublage

Living people
French male voice actors
Year of birth missing (living people)